Edesur is a distributor of electricity in Argentina, headquartered in Buenos Aires.

Purchasing a majority stake in the newly privatized Segba utility in 1992, the company has an exclusive concession to distribute electricity in the south section of Greater Buenos Aires, and in the south of Buenos Aires proper.

See also
 2019 South American blackout

References

External links
 

Electric power companies of Argentina
Electric power distribution network operators
Energy companies established in 1992
Argentine companies established in 1992